Dianelys Pérez (born 28 June 1988) is a Cuban sports shooter. She competed in the Women's 10 metre air rifle and the women's 50 metre three positions events at the 2012 Summer Olympics.  At the 2016 Olympics, she again competed in both events.

References

External links
 

1988 births
Living people
Cuban female sport shooters
Olympic shooters of Cuba
Shooters at the 2012 Summer Olympics
Shooters at the 2016 Summer Olympics
Sportspeople from Matanzas
Pan American Games medalists in shooting
Pan American Games gold medalists for Cuba
Shooters at the 2015 Pan American Games
21st-century Cuban women